Sankethi may refer to:

 Sankethi dialect
 Sankethi people

Language and nationality disambiguation pages